Pogo oscillation is a self-excited vibration in liquid-propellant rocket engines caused by combustion instability.  The unstable combustion results in variations of engine thrust, causing variations of acceleration on the vehicle's flexible structure, which in turn cause variations in propellant pressure and flow rate, closing the self-excitation cycle. The name is a metaphor comparing the longitudinal vibration to the bouncing of a pogo stick. Pogo oscillation places stress on the frame of the vehicle, which in severe cases can be dangerous.

Origin 

In general, pogo oscillation occurs when a surge in engine pressure increases back pressure against the fuel coming into the engine, reducing engine pressure, causing more fuel to come in and increasing engine pressure again.  In this way, a rocket engine experiencing pogo oscillations is conceptually operating more like a pulsejet or pulse detonation engine.  If the pulse cycle happens to match a resonance frequency of the rocket then dangerous oscillations can occur through positive feedback, which can, in extreme cases, tear the vehicle apart.  Other situations that can induce fuel pressure fluctuations include flexing of fuel pipes.

Another situation producing pogo oscillation occurs when the engine is moving longitudinally with fluctuating speed. Owing to inertia, if the speed of the vehicle suddenly increases, the fuel inside the fuel tank tends to "fall behind" and is forced into the turbopump, a situation somewhat similar to the slosh of liquid inside a tanker. This creates excess pressure to the turbopump and causes unintended excessive fuel to be delivered. This in turn creates excessive thrust and causes the vehicle to accelerate which leads to further increase in turbopump pressure and an unintended increase in fuel delivery. This can set up a vicious circle, and can result in structural failure in the vehicle.

The most famous pogo oscillation was in the Titan II first stage. It was a factor and delay in manrating the Titan II for the Gemini program.  And another was theSaturn V first stage, S-IC, on the flight of Apollo 6 caused by the cruciform thrust structure. This structure consisted of two perpendicular I-beams, with an engine on the end of each beam and the center engine at the intersection of the beams.  The center of the cruciform was unsupported, so the central F-1 engine caused the structure to bend upwards.  The pogo oscillation occurred when this structure sprang back, lengthening the center engine's fuel line bellows (which was mounted down the center of the cruciform), temporarily reducing the fuel flow and thus reducing thrust.  At the other end of the oscillation, the fuel line was compressed, increasing fuel flow. This caused a sinusoidal thrust oscillation during the first stage ascent.

Hazard 
If the oscillation is left unchecked, failures can result.  One case occurred in the middle J-2 engine of the second stage, S-II, of the Apollo 13 lunar mission in 1970.  In this case, the engine shut down before the oscillations could cause damage to the vehicle.  Later events in this mission (an oxygen tank exploded two days later) overshadowed the pogo problem. Pogo also had been experienced in the S-IC first stage of the unmanned Apollo 6 test flight in 1968.  One of the Soviet Union's N1-L3 rocket test flights suffered pogo oscillations in the first stage on February 21, 1969. The launch vehicle reached initial engine cutoff, but exploded 107 seconds after liftoff and disintegrated. There are other cases during unmanned launches in the 1950s and 1960s where the pogo effect caused catastrophic launch failures, such as the first Soviet spacecraft to the moon Luna E-1 No.1 and Luna E-1 No.2 in September and October 1958.

Modern vibration analysis methods can account for the pogo oscillation to ensure that it is far away from the vehicle's resonant frequencies. Suppression methods include damping mechanisms or bellows in propellant lines. The Space Shuttle main engines each had a damper in the LOX line, but not in the hydrogen fuel line.

See also 
Slosh dynamics

References

External links 
Sci.space.shuttle newsgroup discussions of pogo
NASA Technical Paper on Flexible Propellant Lines Including Pogo Suppressors

Spacecraft propulsion

ja:ロケットエンジン#Pogo振動